This is a list of nickel mines in Canada sorted by province.

Manitoba

Newfoundland and Labrador

Ontario

Quebec

References

 
 Nickel